Emily Harper (born February 16, 1978, in Cincinnati, Ohio) is an American actress.

Career 
She starred in a Mike's Hard Lemonade commercial in 2004. Harper portrayed Fancy Crane on the soap opera Passions from 2005 to 2008. She was introduced as the potential love interest of Noah Bennett (played by Dylan Fergus). This was Harper's first regular role as an actress on a TV series. Harper was also a Laker Girl (cheerleader) for the Los Angeles Lakers NBA team from 2000 until 2003. Her other TV experience includes hosting several seasons of both Lakers TV and Sparks TV.  She was also in the TV pilot Inside Schwartz.

Filmography

External links

SoapCentral.com - Profile of Fancy Crane character.

1978 births
Living people
American soap opera actresses
American television actresses
Actresses from Cincinnati
National Basketball Association cheerleaders
American cheerleaders
21st-century American actresses